United States v. Brignoni-Ponce, 422 U.S. 873 (1975), was the case in which the Supreme Court determined it was a violation of the Fourth Amendment for a roving patrol car to stop a vehicle solely on the basis of the driver appearing to be of Mexican descent. A roving patrol car must have articulable facts that allow for an officer to have a reasonable suspicion that the person is carrying illegal aliens beyond their ethnicity. The Court handed down a 9–0 decision that affirmed the Circuit Court's ruling in the case.

Background

As part of normal procedure for the United States Border Patrol in Southern California there was a permanent traffic checkpoint set up Interstate 5 just outside San Clemente, California. On March 11, 1973, the checkpoint had been closed because of inclement weather so the officers sat on the side of the highway in their vehicle with their headlights facing northbound traffic. They pursued a vehicle with three occupants in it, stating later that their only reason for pursuing the vehicle was because of the occupant's apparent Mexican ethnicity.

The officers questioned Felix Humberto Brignoni-Ponce and his two passengers about their citizenship and discovered that Brignoni-Ponce's two passengers had entered the country illegally. The officers proceeded to arrest the three individuals. The driver was charged with two counts of knowingly transporting illegal immigrants, a violation of § 274 (a) (2) of the Immigration and Nationality Act, 66 Stat. 228 and the two passengers were arrested for entering the country illegally.

At the trial for the defendant, he argued that the two passengers should not have to testify because their statements were the result of an illegal seizure, but his motion was denied. The two passengers testified and the defendant was found guilty of both counts. The defendant then appealed the decision saying that because the stop was based solely on the basis of his ethnicity, it was a violation of his Fourth Amendment rights. The Fourth Amendment protects a person from unreasonable search and seizures.

Border Patrol's argument

The Border Patrol derived its power to stop the individuals from two separate laws. The first was Section 287 (a) (1) of the Immigration and Nationality Act, 8 U. S. C. § 1357 (a) (1), authorizes any officer or employee of the Immigration and Naturalization Service without a warrant, "to interrogate any alien or person believed to be an alien as to his right to be or to remain in the United States." The second was Section 287 (a) (3) of the Act, 8 U. S. C. § 1357 (a) (3), which authorizes agents, without a warrant, to search cars traveling near the border that are suspected to have or are transporting persons trying to enter the country illegally. From this, they believe that their actions were lawful even if an act of Congress cannot supersede the Constitution.

Court's decision

The Court held a search and seizure based solely on the "appearance of Mexican ancestry" violates the Fourth Amendment. Without a reasonable suspicion generated by articulable facts, a police search is illegal.

According to the precedent set in Terry v. Ohio and Adams v. Williams, under appropriate circumstances, a roving patrol may perform a limited search and seizure without having probable cause to arrest the person. These circumstances include information that the person may have drugs or weapons, a visual scan of the person's vehicle reveals something suspicious or as in this case a visual reason to believe that the person is carrying illegal aliens into the country.

Valid examples of what constitutes as suspicion of carrying illegal aliens include driving a station wagon with fold down seats or spare tires removed to conceal aliens, having a low riding vehicle, having an overly packed vehicle, or driving erratically. Also, the officer's knowledge of the area, experience, and training in dealing with illegal aliens dictates the decision to pursue a search. Thus, an officer must have one of these articulable facts in order stop someone and question their citizenship.

However, in this case the defendants were stopped for one reason: solely on the basis of their appeared Mexican ancestry. The court concluded that this reason alone made the stop unreasonable. The lack of articulable facts to generate suspicion that the car was carrying illegal aliens meant that this search was illegal. There are millions of people living in the area around San Diego that are naturalized and native-born of Mexico and "even in the border area, a small proportion of them are aliens." It is unreasonable to assume that any person who appears Mexican is an illegal alien or could be transporting illegal aliens. To allow such unrestricted roving patrol stops would be to subject all residents of the border area to unreasonable searches and seizures just because of their ethnicity, therefore the stop of the defendant was a violation of the Fourth Amendment and the charges were dropped.

History of Felix Humberto Brignoni-Ponce

Despite being freed from the charges in this case,  Brignoni-Ponce was arrested for carrying illegal aliens five times in fifteen years, spending over three years in jail for his crimes. His last-known arrest was on February 25, 1981, six years after his Supreme Court case was decided, at a San Clemente checkpoint, for smuggling thirteen illegal aliens. Ironically, Brignoni-Ponce was born in Puerto Rico, not of Mexican descent as suspected in his initial stop by the Border Patrol, and is an American citizen. This case's effects on Border Patrol agents have been compared to the effects the Miranda decision had on attorneys and prosecutors.

References

Further reading

External links

United States Supreme Court cases
United States Supreme Court cases of the Burger Court
United States Fourth Amendment case law
1975 in United States case law
Border guards
Mexico–United States relations
United States immigration and naturalization case law
Mexican American